A series of earthquakes struck Banja Luka on October 26 and 27, 1969. The earthquakes began with an unusually strong tremor on the night of October 26 at 02:55. Foreshocks commenced several hours later and small tremors continued until 08:53. The mainshock occurred at 16:36. The earthquake was followed by a 6.1 magnitude a day later. It was categorized as a doublet earthquake.

Damage
Material damage was widespread; 86,000 apartments were completely destroyed. Great damage was inflicted on school (266), cultural (146), health (133), social and public administration facilities (152). The economy suffered significant losses. In the following years, all companies worked with significantly reduced capacities, and some completely stopped production.

The buses were driven by primary and secondary school students from Banja Luka, who had just finished the school year in various parts of Yugoslavia. Reconstruction and rehabilitation of devastated buildings soon began, the city's infrastructure was restored and rapid urbanization began.

By the end of the earthquake, 15 people from Banja Luka were confirmed dead, and 1,117 people were injured.

See also
 List of earthquakes in 1969
 2020 Petrinja earthquake

References

Further reading
 

Banja Luka
History of Banja Luka
1969 Banja Luka
Banja Luka Earthquake
Doublet earthquakes
Earthquakes in Bosnia and Herzegovina